F4 Argentina Championship is a racing series regulated according to FIA Formula 4.

History
Gerhard Berger and the FIA Singleseater Commission launched Formula 4 in March 2013. The goal of the Formula 4 was to make the ladder to Formula 1 more transparent. Besides sporting and technical regulations, costs are also regulated. A car to compete in this category may not exceed €30,000 and a single season in Formula 4 may not exceed €100,000.

The 2019 F4 Argentina Championship season was originally slated to begin at Buenos Aires in July and conclude at the same circuit on December 1st. The start of the season was postponed to October 18-19, then delayed again before being completely cancelled. The new Argentinian Formula 4 Championship has had his first season delayed once again, with a start date planned for 2020, however the season was cancelled due to COVID-19 pandemic. The series started in 2021.

Format 
Each round consists of two practice sessions, one qualifying session that determines grid for Race 1. The grid for Race 2 is set by the fastest lap in the first race.

Car
The championship feature cars are designed and built by French race car constructor Mygale. The cars are made  up of carbon fiber and has monocoque chassis. The engine is made up of 2.0 Geely G-Power JLD-4G20.

Champions

Drivers Champions

Circuits

Notes

References

External links 
 

 
Formula racing series
Recurring sporting events established in 2020
Formula 4 series
Auto racing series in Argentina